Hillsdale Lake is a reservoir located in the northwestern part of Miami County, in northeast Kansas and the central United States; it is approximately  from Kansas City.

Hillsdale Dam, impounding the Big Bull Creek to create the V-shaped reservoir, was completed in 1982 as a flood control project of the United States Army Corps of Engineers. Fix link* The reservoir has a normal storage capacity of 76,000 acre-feet.  No hydroelectric power is generated by the earthen dam.  Recreational facilities include Hillsdale State Park, opened in 1994.

See also
 List of Kansas state parks
 List of lakes, reservoirs, and dams in Kansas
 List of rivers of Kansas

References

External links
 Hillsdale Lake, official website

Reservoirs in Kansas
Protected areas of Miami County, Kansas
Dams in Kansas
United States Army Corps of Engineers dams
Dams completed in 1982
Bodies of water of Miami County, Kansas
1982 establishments in Kansas